"The Happening" is a 1967 song recorded by Motown artists The Supremes. It served as the theme song of the 1967 Columbia Pictures film The Happening, and was released as a single by Motown at the time of the film's release that spring. While the movie flopped, the song peaked at number 1 on the Billboard Hot 100 pop singles chart in May, becoming The Supremes' tenth number 1 single in the United States, peaking in the top 10 on the UK Singles Chart at number 6, and in the top 5 in the Australian Pop Chart and in the Dutch Pop Chart.

History
Produced by Brian Holland and Lamont Dozier, and written by Holland–Dozier–Holland and Frank De Vol (The Happening's musical director), "The Happening" was the final single issued by The Supremes under that name. Between the release of "The Happening" and the next Supremes single, "Reflections," the group's billing changed to Diana Ross & the Supremes, and Florence Ballard was replaced with Cindy Birdsong of Patti LaBelle & the Blue Belles.

It has been widely believed, and reported that the instrumental track was recorded in Los Angeles using members of the Wrecking Crew, particularly drummer Hal Blaine. The song was authored by L.A.-based writer Frank DeVol, and sessions for the single were cut in a Los Angeles studio. Two reports suggest all or part of the final released single was recorded in Detroit. Supremes biographer Mark Ribowsky wrote in 2008 that "early tracks [were laid down] in L.A." but "couldn't catch the groove . . .needing a stronger, funkier bottom and backbeat." Ribowsky maintains that "they started all over again in Studio A in March [1967]."  However, Chris Jisi, writing in 2009, notes the track was cut in Los Angeles but was sent back to re-record the bass line with Motown regular James Jamerson, and the final version contained at minimum his contribution.

Ballard's final of the 17 appearances The Supremes made on the hit CBS variety television program The Ed Sullivan Show was on an episode where she performed this song live from Expo 67 in Montréal on Sunday, May 7, 1967, going to number 1 the same week.

Billboard described the single as being "in the good-time rhythm music bag" as "the trio changes pace with this
classy performance of the new film theme."  Cash Box called the single a "light, bouncy, up-tempo, romp" that is a "sure fire chart topper."

Lyrics
The selection's lyrics do not specify exactly what "the happening" is, although the implication is the singer has been abandoned in a love relationship.  The singer says she was "sure, I felt secure" and "I was riding high on top of the world".  But something happens that is negative and it leaves the individual narrating the selection in worse shape, than before it "just happened".

The event brings the singer back to reality, seeing "life for what it is.  It's not a dream, it's not all bliss".  The lyrics also warn that what happened to her, "it" can happen to you.  Despite the negative experience, "The Happening" is sung in a happy, upbeat style.

Personnel
Lead vocals by Diana Ross
Background vocals by Florence Ballard and Mary Wilson
Instrumentation by the Funk Brothers  NOTE: This has been disputed.
James Jamerson – bass

Charts

Weekly charts

Year-end charts

Certifications

Other versions
"The Happening" was an instrumental hit for Herb Alpert & the Tijuana Brass in 1967 making number 32 on the Billboard chart.

See also
 List of Hot 100 number-one singles of 1967 (U.S.)

References

External links 
 List of cover versions of "The Happening" at SecondHandSongs.com
 

1967 singles
Film theme songs
The Supremes songs
Herb Alpert songs
Billboard Hot 100 number-one singles
Cashbox number-one singles
Songs written by Holland–Dozier–Holland
Motown singles
1967 songs
Song recordings produced by Lamont Dozier
Song recordings produced by Brian Holland